Tamsin Hinchley (née Barnett, born 10 March 1980) is an Australian volleyball player. Born in Adelaide, Hinchley was on the Australian indoor squad at the 2000 Summer Olympics.  At the 2008 and 2012 Summer Olympics, Hinchley partnered with Natalie Cook in beach volleyball.  Hinchley and Cook also partner on the Swatch FIVB World Tour, and in 2007 Hinchley was named the World Tour's most improved player.

Personal life
Tamsin is married to Al Hinchley. In 2009, she gave birth to a son, Arley K. Hinchley.

References

External links
 
 
 
 
 
 

1980 births
Living people
Australian women's volleyball players
Australian women's beach volleyball players
Olympic volleyball players of Australia
Olympic beach volleyball players of Australia
Volleyball players at the 2000 Summer Olympics
Beach volleyball players at the 2008 Summer Olympics
Beach volleyball players at the 2012 Summer Olympics
Sportswomen from South Australia
Sportspeople from Adelaide
21st-century Australian women